Butherium erythropus is a species of beetle in the family Cerambycidae, the only species in the genus Butherium.

References

Cerambycini